Susan Schwalb is a contemporary silverpoint artist.

Biography
Schwalb was born in New York City (in 1944). She attended the Carnegie Mellon University.  In 1983 she married composer Martin Boykan and works from her Manhattan studio.

Her work is represented in the National Gallery of Art, Washington D.C.,  The Metropolitan Museum of Art the British Museum, London, the Brooklyn Museum, New York, the Fogg Museum, Harvard University, Cambridge, Massachusetts, the Museum of Fine Arts, Houston, Texas,  the Library of Congress, Washington, DC, the Rose Art Museum, Brandeis University, Waltham, Massachusetts, and the Yale University Art Gallery, New Haven, Connecticut.

References

Further reading
Beck-Friedman, Tova, November 2005, "Susan Schwalb: Drawn in Metal", The New York Art World
Broude, Norma and Garrard, Mary (ed), (1994), "The Power of Feminist Art: The American Movement of the 1970s, History and Impact," Harry Abrams
Cohen, Joyce, August/September 1996, "Galaxies and Other Matter and Intervals", Art New England 	
Earley, Sandra, 9 September 1985, "Art: The Siren Song of Silverpoint", The Wall Street Journal
Eshoo, Amy, 560 Broadway- A New York Drawing Collection at Work, 1991–2006, Yale University Press, 2007
Faxon, Alicia, Susan Schwalb: Moments of Resonance, Art New England, June/July ’99
Faxon, Alicia, Drawing: Line or Image, New Art Examiner, 1/90
Faxon, Alicia and Moore, Sylvia, Pilgrims and Pioneers: New England Women in the Arts, Midmarch Arts Books, 1987
Glueck, Grace, Imagery from the Jewish Consciousness, The New York Times, 6/6/82
Harrison, Helen A., Contemporary Metalpoint Drawings, The New York Times, 4/3/94
Heller, Jules and Nancy G., American Women Artists of the Twentieth Century, Garland Publishing Co., 1995
Kohen, Helen L., Silverpoint Makes for Golden Exhibit, The Miami Herald, 4/21/85
Langdon, Ann, The Creation Series, Art New England, December 1992 / January 1993
Langer, Cassandra, The Creation Series: 15 Years of Silverpoint, Women Artists News, Fall 1990
Mandel, Elizabeth, Intricate Enigma: a look at silverpoint, then and now, ArtsEditor.com,	1/25/2010
Marter, Joan, Susan Schwalb, Womanart, Winter ’77-’78
Mathews-Berenson, Margaret, The Light Touch, American Artist Drawing, Spring, 2004
McQuaid, Cate, Public Eyes; Light Grids; Gallery on the MBTA, The Boston Globe,  3/4/99
McQuaid, Cate, Natural Deceptions; Rejoicing Stars, Boston Globe, 5/2/96
Miller, Lynn and Swenson, Sally, Lives and Works, Talks with Women Artists, Scarecrow Press, 1981
Orenstein, Gloria, Feman Vision and Visibility: Contemporary Jewish Women Artists Visualize the Invisible, Femspec, Vol.4 Issue 2, Lexington Press, 2004
Schwendenwien, Jude, From Religious Symbols to Detailed Abstractions, The Hartford Courant, 10/25/92
Soltes, Ori Z., Fixing the World: Jewish American Painters in the Twentieth Century, Brandeis University Press/University Press of New England, 2003
Soltes, Ori Z., Heilige Zeichen, Parthas Verlag, Berlin, Germany, 2007
Temin, Christine, Silverpoint's Delicate Power, The Boston Globe, 11/14/85
Walentini, Joseph Susan Schwalb, Abstract Art Online Vol. VI, No. 3   	(www.abartonline.com), 12/4/03
Waterman, Jill, Delicate Understandings, ArtsMedia, 6/15- 7/15/00
Nashim: A Journal of Jewish Women's Studies & Gender, Fall, Number 16, 2008

External links
 Susan Schwalb's website
 Askart.com - Susan Schwalb
 Kentler International Drawing Space - Re-inventing Silverpoint - Susan Schwalb

20th-century American painters
21st-century American painters
American printmakers
American abstract artists
Painters from New York City
Carnegie Mellon University College of Fine Arts alumni
Living people
1944 births
20th-century American women artists
American women printmakers
21st-century American women artists
American women painters
The High School of Music & Art alumni